Harold Bell Elliott [Rowdy] (July 8, 1890 – February 12, 1934) was a catcher in Major League Baseball who played for the Boston Doves, Chicago Cubs and Brooklyn Robins in parts of five seasons spanning 1910–1920. Listed at 5' 9", 160 lb., Elliott batted and threw right handed. He was born in Kokomo, Indiana.

Elliott spent 23 years in baseball between 1907 and 1929, which included his five in the majors and 20 in the minor leagues, while losing most of 1918 when he joined the United States Navy during World War I.

On February 23, 1920, Elliott married Helena McKerman, a native of North Dakota, in Alameda County, California.  He died at the age of 43 at Harbor Hospital in San Francisco, California from injuries received in a fall from an apartment house window. The circumstances of his death are still a mystery.

References

External links

1890 births
1934 deaths
United States Navy personnel of World War I
Baseball players from Indiana
Birmingham Barons players
Boston Doves players
Brooklyn Robins players
Chicago Cubs players
Columbus Senators players
Major League Baseball catchers
Nashville Vols players
Newark Bears (IL) players
Oakland Oaks (baseball) managers
Oakland Oaks (baseball) players
Sportspeople from Kokomo, Indiana
Pittsfield Hillies players
Portland Beavers players
Providence Grays (minor league) players
Sacramento Senators players
Shreveport Sports players
Springfield Senators players
Toledo Mud Hens players
Venice Tigers players
Kewanee Boilermakers players
Charleston Broom Corn Cutters players
Accidental deaths from falls